Mauritius–Turkey relations are the foreign relations between Mauritius and Turkey.
The Turkish ambassador to Madagascar is also accredited to Mauritius. Turkey also has an Honorary Consulate-General in Port-Louis. Mauritius's ambassador in Berlin is also accredited to Turkey.

Diplomatic Relations 
Turkey provides Mauritius financial aid. In addition to trade, Turkey provides Mauritius with numerous kinds of assistance — including computerizing government ministries, performing highway maintenance to constructing electric power stations.

Economic Relations 
 Trade volume between the two countries was 76.5 million USD in 2019. 
 There are direct flights from Istanbul to Port-Louis since December 15, 2015.

Educational Relations 
 The two countries signed an educational agreement that allows junior diplomats from Mauritius to get trained in Turkey.
 Turkey provided Türkiye Scholarships, which provides funding for undergraduate degrees in Turkey, to 54 students from the Mauritius. 
 Turkey and Mauritius signed an agreement to set up a Joint Economic Committee. The first meeting of the Joint Economic Committee in Port-Louis on November 17-18, 2016 established the framework of a Free Trade Agreement.

See also 

 Foreign relations of Mauritius
 Foreign relations of Turkey

References 

Turkey
Bilateral relations of Turkey